Vulliamy is a surname. Notable people with the surname include:

Blanche Georgiana Vulliamy (1869–1923), English ceramic artist, painter, and writer
Ed Vulliamy (born 1954), English journalist and writer
Fred Vulliamy (1913–1968), Canadian politician
Vulliamy family, family of clockmakers